Budorcas is a genus of bovid that contains a single living species, the takin (Budorcas taxicolor). Two extinct species are known from the Pliocene, B. teilhardi from China and B. churcheri from Ethiopia. The presence of the genus in Africa indicates that it was far more widespread in the past.

Etymology

References

Mammal genera
Mammal genera with one living species
Taxa named by Brian Houghton Hodgson
Caprids
Mammals described in 1850